Chanubanda or Tsanubanda is a village in Krishna district of the Indian state of Andhra Pradesh. It is located in Chatrai mandal of Nuzvid revenue division.

Etymology

This is the most interesting story that before 400 years this place is called as chaluva banda which means cool rock after the time passes this place became chanubanda in Telugu.

References 

Villages in Krishna district